Faisal al Basam (born 30 November 1965) is a Saudi Arabian archer. He competed in the 1984 Summer Olympics.

References

1965 births
Living people
Archers at the 1984 Summer Olympics
Saudi Arabian male archers
Olympic archers of Saudi Arabia